Between 1981 and 1990, five Vietnamese-American journalists were murdered for political reasons. While the ethnic press is the most dangerous for U.S. journalists, more Vietnamese journalists have been killed than journalists from any other group, including African Americans, Latinos, Chinese, or Haitians. Anticommunist organizations like the "Vietnamese Organization to Exterminate Communists and Restore the Nation" (VOECRN) claimed responsibility, but the murders were not investigated.

Background 
The first Vietnamese journalist attacked in the United States survived. In January 1980, the Vietnamese-language magazine office of Van Nghe Tien Phong located in Arlington, Virginia, was set fire by an explosion but publisher Nguyen Thanh Hoang lived. In 1990, when the last of five journalists was killed, the victim also worked for Van Nghe Tien Phong and the publication reported that victim Triet Le was one of 10 of its staff attacked by gunfire inside of one year. After the assassinations of the five and violence that affected other intellectuals, and not only journalists, police in the crime areas had no evidence to pin the murders on any person other than claims made by a group calling itself Vietnamese Party to Exterminate the Communists and Restore the Nation, or VOECRN. Despite the implied targets in the organization's name, the opinions of victims ranged across the spectrum. In a documentary by PBS "Frontline" and ProPublica, "Terror in Little Saigon", the National United Front for the Liberation of Vietnam's assassination arm, known as K-9, was connected to the five deaths.

List of Vietnamese journalists

Deaths 
Five Vietnamese journalists were assassinated in the United States between 1981 and 1990, and their journalism and the controversial political issues they were writing about played a role. Vietnamese political organizations had formed throughout the country and some of these targeted the Vietnamese journalists.

Duong Trong Lam 
The first of five Vietnamese journalists to be murdered, Duong Trong Lam was shot by an assassin 21 July 1981. He was known as a "left-wing" publisher of Cai Dinh Lang (Translated: The Village Temple), a Vietnamese-language newspaper published out of San Francisco, California, and for his criticism of the Vietnam War. A group called Vietnamese Organization to Exterminate Communists and Restore the Nation (VOECRN), which is one of two anti-communism organizations that was known to commit violence, claimed responsibility. His publication of left-wing content was the motive.

Nguyen Dam Phong 
The second murder of a Vietnamese journalist in the United States occurred almost one year after the first incident. Nguyen Dam Phong founded Tu Do (Translated: Freedom) in 1981, which he published out of his home in Houston, Texas. After arriving in the United States, he worked as a factory worker making terrariums and then as a dental technician but was motivated to start his own newspaper as a passion. Phong began receiving threats because the content of his newspaper was critical of right-wing exile groups. He was assassinated on 24 August 1982 at his home and the VOECRN again claimed responsibility.

Tap Van Pham 
The third murder was five years later. This time the VOECRN attacked Tap Van Pham (a.k.a. Hoai Diep Tu) in Garden Grove, California. He did editorial work and advertisements for Mai and other Canadian companies to promote cash transfers and travel services to Vietnam. He was asleep in his office on the morning of 9 August 1987 when it burst into flames and he died afterward from smoke inhalation. Police investigators said the fire was an arson and the VOECRN had doused the office in gasoline and lit it on fire. From this case, police concluded from undisclosed evidence the VOECRN group was connected to other crimes but the Federal Bureau of Investigation refused to get involved in the investigation.

Nhan Trong Do 
The fourth journalist to be assassinated came two years later, when Nhen Trong Do was shot dead in his car in Fairfax County, Virginia. In this case, there were no suspects in the killing. He was a layout designer for Van Nghe Tien Phong.

Triet Le 
The last of five Vietnamese journalists to be assassinated was Triet Le, 61, who lived in Bailey's Crossroads, Virginia. He was also employed by Van Nghe Tien Phong, where he was a columnist known for his controversial opinions against communists and the Vietnam government. He was assassinated 22 September 1990. The VOECRN had Triet Le on its hit list since 1982 from evidence found in Nguyen Dam Phong's home. The organization carried out the murder while Triet Le was parking his car in front of his home. The attacker also killed his wife, an innocent bystander, by gunfire.

Impact 
The assassination of Vietnamese journalists in the United States was motivated by the political opinions of the writers and their publications, and this motive increased the fear in the Vietnamese-American community about the free expression of ideas and opinions. After one of the murders, Giang Huu Tuyen, the publisher of Viet Bao, said, "I worry that one day somebody will come into my office and say to me, 'I don't like your paper.' Then, 'Bang!' It's a risky business. People are very emotional over all that has happened."

See also 
 List of journalists killed in the United States

References

External links
Propublica, Terror in Little Saigon

American writers of Vietnamese descent

Ethnic press in the United States